Rasoolpur aabad or Rasool Pur aabad can refer to the following settlements:

India 
Rasoolpur, Raibareli, Uttar Pradesh
Rasoolpur Abad, Uttar Pradesh
Rasoolpur Soor, Uttar Pradesh

Pakistan 
Rasool Pur, Gujrat
Rasool Pur, Sindh
Rasool Pur, Rajanpur